Kelly Robbins (born September 29, 1969) is a former American professional golfer. She became a member of the LPGA Tour in 1992 and won nine LPGA Tour events, including one major championship, during her career.

Amateur career
Robbins was born in Mount Pleasant, Michigan. She started playing golf at the age of 8. She attended the University of Tulsa, where she was a member of the NCAA Championship team in 1988. Throughout her collegiate career, she won seven individual titles and twice was named a First-Team All-American. In 1991, she was honored as the NCAA Co-Player of the Year along with Annika Sörenstam and was the North and South Amateur Championship winner .

Professional career
Robbins joined the LPGA Tour in 1992. She qualified for the Tour on her first attempt. She has won nine tournaments on the tour, including one major, the 1995 McDonald's LPGA Championship. She was most successful in the mid-1990s, finishing in the top-10 on the money list four years in a row, from 1994 to 1997. In 2005, she only played two LPGA Tour events due to a back injury. She retired from competitive golf in 2007.

In 2008, was named co-assistant captain of the 2009 U.S. Solheim Cup team.

Professional wins

LPGA Tour wins (9)

LPGA Tour playoff record (4–3)

Other wins
1994 Diner's Club Matches (with Tammie Green)
1995 Diner's Club Matches (with Tammie Green)
1997 Gillette Tour Challenge Championship (with Jim Colbert and Nick Price)

Major championships

Wins (1)

Team appearances
Professional
Solheim Cup (representing the United States): 1994 (winners), 1996 (winners), 1998 (winners), 2000, 2002 (winners), 2003

External links

American female golfers
LPGA Tour golfers
Tulsa Golden Hurricane women's golfers
Winners of LPGA major golf championships
Solheim Cup competitors for the United States
Golfers from Michigan
People from Mount Pleasant, Michigan
1969 births
Living people
21st-century American women